Gardner Sheppard Hardee (July 19, 1842 – July 26, 1926) was the founding settler of Rockledge, Florida and a member of the Florida Senate representing the 13th district from 1889 to 1892. He was also a member of the Brevard County Board of Commissioners.

He was the son of Thomas E. Hardee and Grace Jones, and the brother of Robert A. Hardee, and Buddy Hardee.

In 1888, he was elected over Ed Cecil.

References 

1842 births
1926 deaths
Citrus farmers from Florida
Confederate States Army personnel
County commissioners in Florida
Florida pioneers
Democratic Party Florida state senators
People from Rockledge, Florida
People from Brooks County, Georgia
People of Georgia (U.S. state) in the American Civil War